Per Gustaf August Cossva Anckarsvärd (17 August 1865 – 25 September 1953) was a Swedish diplomat.

Career
Anckarsvärd was born in Stockholm, Sweden, and was the son of intendant Theodor Anckarsvärd (1816–1878) and Ellen Nyström (1833–1898). He passed his maturity examination in 1884 and became a student in Uppsala in 1885, where he passed his preliminary examination in 1886 and completed his civil service degree in law (hovrättsexamen) in 1889. Anckarsvärd was an extraordinary notary in Svea Court of Appeal in 1889 and became a valet de chambre in 1890 and attaché at the Ministry for Foreign Affairs the same year. Anckarsvärd became acting second secretary at the Foreign Ministry in 1894 and regular second secretary at the Foreign Ministry in 1896. He became chamberlain in 1899 and was the herald at the Orders of His Majesty the King from 1900 to 1906 and was appointed first secretary in 1901.

Anckarsvärd was then legation secretary in Berlin in 1903, becoming deputy director and head of the Foreign Ministry's consulate department in 1904. He was appointed envoy extraordinary and minister plenipotentiary as well as consul general in Constantinople in 1906, consular judge there in 1909 and envoy in Sofia in 1914 (accredited from Constantinople). Anckarsvärd was Swedish envoy in Constantinople during the Armenian genocide, and thus one of its eyewitnesses. During the events, Anckarsvärd highlighted the aim of the Young Turk government and its policies to "exterminate the Armenian nation". He left Constantinople in 1920 to serve as envoy extraordinary and minister plenipotentiary in Warsaw from 1920 to 1931. Anckarsvärd declared his availability in 1931 and retired in 1932.

Personal life
On 29 November 1900 Anckarsvärd married in New York Maude Marie Agnes Duryea (1880–1949), the daughter of Peter Duryea and Mathilde Filkins. They had three children: Carl Magnus Cossva (born 1 December 1901 in Stockholm), Ellen Maude (born 19 June 1904 in Berlin) and Dagmar Maria (born 10 January 1909 in Constantinople).

Awards and decorations
Anckarsvärd's awards:
King Gustaf V's Jubilee Commemorative Medal (1928)
Commander Grand Cross of the Order of the Polar Star (1916)
Grand Cross of the Order of the Dannebrog (1910)
Grand Cross of the Order of the White Rose of Finland (1922)
Grand Cross of the Order of Polonia Restituta (1928)
Grand Cross of the Order of St. Sava (1920)
First Class of the Order of Osmanieh (1907)
First Class of the Order of the Medjidie (1920)
Commander of the Order of the White Falcon (1901)
Knight of the Order of the Crown of Italy (1892)
Knight, 1st Class of the Order of St. Olav (1904)
Knight, 3rd Class of the Order of the Crown (1894)
4th Class of the Order of the Crown of Thailand (1897)

See also
Witnesses and testimonies of the Armenian genocide

References

1865 births
1953 deaths
Consuls-general of Sweden
Ambassadors of Sweden to Turkey
Ambassadors of Sweden to Bulgaria
Ambassadors of Sweden to Poland
Politicians from Stockholm
Commanders Grand Cross of the Order of the Polar Star
Witnesses of the Armenian genocide